Tetraibidion is a genus of beetles in the family Cerambycidae, containing the following species:

 Tetraibidion aurivillii (Gounelle, 1909)
 Tetraibidion concolor Martins, 2006
 Tetraibidion ephimerum Martins, 1967
 Tetraibidion sahlbergi (Aurivillius, 1899)

References

Ibidionini